Akpınar is a small village and yayla (summer resort)  in Erdemli district of Mersin Province, Turkey. At  it is situated in the Taurus Mountains. The population of Akpınar was 41 as of 2012. However being a yayla, the population increases during the summer months and there are most of the buildings in the village are vacant during the winter months.

References 

Villages in Erdemli District